Yalkae, a Joker in High School is a 1977 South Korean comedy film starring Lee Seung-hyeon, Kim Jeong-hun and Hah Myung-joong, and directed by Seok Rae-myeong. It was based on Cho Heun-pa's bestselling novel A Legend of Urchins (Yalgaejeon).

Plot
Na Du-su (Lee Seung-hyeon), nicknamed "Yalkae" (meaning "cheeky, cocky person"), is in his second year of high school and acts like a troublemaker.

When approached by Ho-cheol, Du-su refuses to compensate him.

Cast
 Lee Seung-hyeon as Na Du-su
 Kim Jeong-hun as Ho-cheol 
 Hah Myung-joong as Baek Sang-do 
 Jeong Yun-hui as Na Du-ju
 Kang Ju-hee as In-suk 
 Jin Woo-young as Yong-ho

Sequels and spinoffs

Korean film stamps
In 2009, Korea Post issues Yalkae, a Joker in High School as part of the third series of Korean film stamps, which also includes The Road to Sampo, Never Ever Forget Me and Chilsu and Mansu.

References

External links 
 
 

1977 comedy-drama films
1970s Korean-language films
South Korean comedy-drama films